Slygo Valley is a valley in the Dade County, Georgia, located approximately 10 miles north of Trenton, Georgia
It is at an elevation of approximately 705 feet above mean sea level. The valley is drained by Squirrel Town Creek.

Slygo Valley was named after a Native American chieftain.

References

Landforms of Dade County, Georgia
Valleys of Georgia (U.S. state)